Ron Jared Friedman (born November 30, 1972) is an American screenwriter best known for his work with writing partner Steve Bencich.

Friedman and Bencich have collaborated on screenplays for several animated films, including Brother Bear, Chicken Little and Open Season.  DreamWorks has purchased their comedy screenplay Gullible's Travels, about a gullible man who travels in time in a portable toilet.

Filmography
Screenplays, all co-written with Steve Bencich:
The Best Movie Ever Made (1994)
Paul McCall (1996)
Brother Bear (2003)
Chicken Little (2005)
Open Season (2006)
Cats & Dogs: The Revenge of Kitty Galore (2010)
The Monkey King (2023)

References

External links

American male screenwriters
Animation screenwriters
Living people
University of Arizona alumni
1972 births
Screenwriters from Arizona
Walt Disney Animation Studios people
Sony Pictures Animation people